Prospero's Books is a 1991 British avant-garde film adaptation of William Shakespeare's  The Tempest, written and directed by Peter Greenaway. Sir John Gielgud plays Prospero, the protagonist who provides the off-screen narration and the voices to the other story characters. As noted by Peter Conrad in The New York Times on 17 November 1991, Greenaway intended the film “as an homage to the actor and to his "mastery of illusion." In the film, Prospero is Shakespeare, and having rehearsed the action inside his head, speaking the lines of all the other characters, he concludes the film by sitting down to write The Tempest.” 

Stylistically, Prospero's Books is narratively and cinematically innovative in its techniques, combining mime, dance, opera, and animation. Edited in Japan, the film makes extensive use of digital image manipulation (using Hi-Vision video inserts and the Quantel Paintbox system), often overlaying multiple moving and still pictures with animations. Michael Nyman composed the musical score and Karine Saporta choreographed the dance. The film is also notable for its extensive use of nudity, reminiscent of Renaissance paintings of mythological characters. The nude actors and extras represent a cross-section of male and female humanity.

Plot 
Prospero's Books is a complex tale based upon William Shakespeare's The Tempest. Miranda, the daughter of Prospero, an exiled magician, falls in love with Ferdinand, the son of his enemy; while the sorcerer's sprite, Ariel, convinces him to abandon revenge against the traitors from his earlier life. In the film, Prospero is Shakespeare himself, conceiving, designing, rehearsing, directing and performing the story's action as it unfolds and in the end, sitting down to write the completed work.

Ariel is played by four actors: three acrobats—a boy, an adolescent, and a youth—and a boy singer. Each represents a classical elemental.

The Books 

The books of Prospero number 24, according to the production design, which outlines each volume's content. The list is reminiscent of the lost books of Epicurus.

 A Book of Water
 A Book of Mirrors
 A Book of Mythologies
 A Primer of the Small Stars
 An Atlas Belonging to Orpheus
 A Harsh Book of Geometry
 The Book of Colours
 The Vesalius Anatomy of Birth
 An Alphabetical Inventory of the Dead
 A Book of Travellers' Tales
 The Book of the Earth
 A Book of Architecture and Other Music
 The Ninety-Two Conceits of the Minotaur
 The Book of Languages
 End-plants
 A Book of Love
 A Bestiary of Past, Present and Future Animals
 The Book of Utopias
 The Book of Universal Cosmography
 Lore of Ruins
 The Autobiographies of Pasiphae and Semiramis
 A Book of Motion
 The Book of Games
 Thirty-Six Plays

Cast

Production and financing
Gielgud is quoted as saying that a film of The Tempest (with him as Prospero) was his life's ambition, as he had been in four stage productions in 1931, 1940, 1957, and 1974. He had approached Alain Resnais, Ingmar Bergman, Akira Kurosawa, and Orson Welles about directing him in it, with Benjamin Britten to compose its score, and Albert Finney as Caliban, before Greenaway agreed. The closest earlier attempts came to being made was in 1967, with Welles both directing and playing Caliban. But after the commercial failure of their film collaboration, Chimes at Midnight, financing for a cinematic Tempest collapsed.

"I don't know whether Greenaway ever saw me in it on stage, I didn't dare to ask him," Sir John told Conrad, who noted that the actor recalls his previous Prosperos in the book Shakespeare -- Hit or Miss?: “At the Old Vic in the 1930s he played the character as 'Dante without a beard'; in 1957 for Peter Brook he was 'an El Greco hermit', disheveled and decrepit; in 1974 for Peter Hall he was a bespectacled magus; now, for Mr. Greenaway, in a film that is a blitz of cultural icons, he is Renaissance man, exercising a universal power through the volumes in his library but confounded by his own sorry mortality.”

“I was glad I knew the part so well, because there was so much going on in the studio to distract me,” Sir John recalled, “I had to parade up and down wearing that cloak which needed four people to lift, and with papers flying in my face all the time. And it was terribly cold in the bath." Sir John spent four frigid days during the winter naked in a swimming pool, to choreograph the shipwreck with which the film begins.

The film was screened out of competition at the 1991 Cannes Film Festival.

Reception 
In his 17 November 1991 article for The New York Times, Peter Conrad observed “…the performance is also a revelation of Sir John himself: simultaneously noble and naughty, a high priest and a joker, contemplating at the end of a long life the value of the art he practices.”

Aggregator Rotten Tomatoes reports a 64% approval of Prospero's Books, with an average rating of 5.9/10 from 25 reviews and a critical consensus that reads: "There is no middle ground for viewers of Peter Greenaway's work, but for his fans, Prospero's Books is reliably daring." Roger Ebert gave the work three stars out of four and argued, "Most of the reviews of this film have missed the point; this is not a narrative, it need not make sense, and it is not 'too difficult' because it could not have been any less so. It is simply a work of original art, which Greenaway asks us to accept or reject on his own terms."

Box office
The film grossed £579,487 at the UK box office. In the United States and Canada, where it was distributed by Miramax Films, it grossed $1.75 million (£1 million).

Soundtrack
This was the last of the collaborations between director Peter Greenaway and composer Michael Nyman. Most of the film's music cues, (excepting Ariel's songs and the Masque) are from an earlier concert, La Traversée de Paris and the score from A Zed & Two Noughts. The soundtrack album is Nyman's sixteenth release.

Track listing

 Full fathom five* – 1:58
 Prospero's curse – 2:38
 While you here do snoring lie* – 1:06
 Prospero's Magic – 5:11
 Miranda – 3:54
 Twelve years since – 2:45
 Come unto these yellow sands* – 3:44
 History of Sycorax – 3:25
 Come and go* – 1:16
 Cornfield – 6:26
 Where the bee sucks* – 4:48
 Caliban's pit – 2:56
 Reconciliation – 2:31
 THE MASQUE+ – 12:12

Performers

Sarah Leonard, Ariel*

Marie Angel, Iris+

Ute Lemper, Ceres+

Deborah Conway, Juno+

Michael Nyman Band

Alexander Balanescu, violin
Jonathan Carney, violin, viola
Elisabeth Perry, violin
Clare Connors, violin
Kate Musker, viola
Tony Hinnigan, cello
Justin Pearson, cello

Paul Morgan, double bass
Tim Amhurst, double bass
Lynda Houghton, double bass
Martin Elliott, bass guitar
David Rix, clarinet, bass clarinet
John Harle, soprano & alto saxophone
David Roach, soprano & alto saxophone

Jamie Talbot, soprano & alto saxophone
Andrew Findon, tenor & baritone saxophone, piccolo, flute
Graham Ashton, trumpet
Richard Clews, horn
Marjorie Dunn, horn
Nigel Barr, bass trombone
Steve Saunders, bass trombone
Michael Nyman, piano & musical direction

Technical

Produced by David Cunningham
Engineer: Michael J. Dutton
Assistant engineer: Dillon Gallagher (PRT), Chris Brown (Abbey Road Studios)
Mixed by Michael J. Dutton, Michael Nyman, and David Cunningham at PRT Studios and Abbey Road Studios
Edited at Abbey Road Studios by Peter Mew
Art Direction: Ann Bradbeer
Photography: Marc Guillamot
Design: Creative Partnership
Artist representative: Don Mousseau

References

External links

 

1991 films
1991 drama films
1991 fantasy films
British drama films
British fantasy films
Films directed by Peter Greenaway
Films based on The Tempest
French drama films
French fantasy films
Films set on islands
Magic realism films
Films scored by Michael Nyman
1990s avant-garde and experimental films
1990s English-language films
1990s British films
1990s French films